"Guise Will Be Guise" is episode 6 of season 2 in the television show Angel. Written by Jane Espenson and directed by Krishna Rao, it was originally broadcast on November 7, 2000 on the WB network. In "Guise Will Be Guise", Angel seeks out the guidance of a swami, while Wesley is forced to impersonate Angel when a powerful businessman demands that Angel guard his daughter Virginia. However, the swami is an impostor trying to keep Angel away from Los Angeles so that one of Virginia's father's competitors can capture her. He wants to do this so she can't be ritually sacrificed, which would give her father great power.

Plot
Angel tries to hunt down Darla at Wolfram & Hart, but Cordelia and Wesley stop him. Angel consults the demon Host at the karaoke bar Caritas, who refers him to Swami T'ish Magev for help. Cordelia and Wesley hold down the office while Angel is away, both glad that he is seeking help to calm his obsession with Darla.

At the office, a thug holds Cordelia at gunpoint, demanding to see Angel, and Wesley is forced to pose as their vampire boss in order to save her. Magnus Bryce, a shrewd and rich businessman, is in need of Angel's services to protect his daughter from assassins from a rival corporation fronted by Paul Lanier. He offers Wesley blood that he forces down, to keep from ruining his cover. Wesley meets Mr. Bryce's daughter, Virginia, and then the two go shopping. Virginia and Wesley talk about how she wants freedom from the prison her father's created for her, then the two kiss. Virginia initially stops, believing Angel's curse is an obstacle, but Wesley claims it is more of a 'recommendation' than anything else — and the two have sex.

Meanwhile, at a quiet cabin, Angel talks with the normal-looking Swami about his choice of clothing, style of car, and brand of hair gel. The Swami advises Angel to find a blond woman and break her heart, so he will feel better about his situation with Darla. Later, the Swami talks to Paul Lanier over the phone, revealing that he's an imposter (one of the bartenders at Caritas overheard Angel and the Host's conversation and tipped Lanier off about Angel's destination). Through their conversation, in which they both believe Angel is with them, they deduce that Wesley is not Angel. Lanier informs Bryce that there is a fake protecting Virginia - a bodyguard who is able to have sex with his virgin daughter.

Gunn sets off to find Angel, but, when he arrives at the cabin, the fake swami knocks him out. Angel witnesses this and uses a fishing pole to pull the man out of the sun and into his grasp. Cordelia arrives at the Bryce home, but before she can rescue Wesley, Virginia finds out that he's not really Angel. In order to get a significant amount of power from a demon, Bryce plans to sacrifice his daughter as the demon will grant immense power to anyone who sacrifices a virgin on their 50th birthday (hence why Bryce chose Angel to be her bodyguard, as the curse would have prevented the two from having sex). Angel and Wesley conclude that Lanier was trying to prevent the sacrifice so that Bryce wouldn't get the power. Bryce starts the sacrificial ritual, but Angel and crew interrupt. The demon appears, but won't take Virginia as a sacrifice because she is not a virgin. Furious about her father's actions, Virginia punches him and disassociates herself from him, revealing that she hasn't been a virgin since she was sixteen. After reading an article in a magazine, both Cordelia and Angel are jealous that Wesley is getting so much publicity as Virginia's bodyguard.

Production
Alexis Denisof enjoyed playing Angel in this episode, although when the BBC asked him what the props team used for the fake blood he had to drink, he was unsure. "I should find out," he says. "I haven’t been feeling well ever since."

Acting
While Cordelia is looking through the criminal database, series producer Kelly A. Manners can be seen on a photo under the name Irwin Oliver.

Writing
In an essay comparing the character of Angel to "melancholy loner" Lord Byron, Amy-Chinn points out that Angel's obsession with his appearance - a running joke in the series - is overtly mocked in this episode, when the swami asks Angel why he dresses in black and drives a black convertible, despite
the LA heat and his vampire sensitivity to sunlight.

Arc significance
This marks the start of Wesley becoming a more fully developed, independent demon fighter in his own right, rather than simply providing the team with information and getting in the way of his allies.
This episode marks the first appearance of Virginia Bryce, who appears in three other episodes.

References

External links

 

Angel (season 2) episodes
2000 American television episodes
Television episodes written by Jane Espenson